Perigonini is a tribe of ground beetles in the family Carabidae. There are at least 4 genera and more than 200 described species in Perigonini.

Genera
These four genera belong to the tribe Perigonini:
 Diploharpus Chaudoir, 1850
 Mizotrechus Bates, 1872
 Perigona Laporte, 1835
 Ripogenites Basilewsky, 1954

References

Lebiinae